Juan Ignacio Alvacete (born 12 January 1991) is an Argentine professional footballer who plays as a centre-back or left-back for Chacarita Juniors.

Career
Alvacete's career began with Independiente Rivadavia. He appeared for his senior debut in a Primera B Nacional defeat to Gimnasia y Esgrima in March 2011, on the way to a total of eight appearances in the 2010–11 campaign as they finished eighteenth. In his 2011–12 opener versus Ferro Carril Oeste on 11 September 2011, Alvacete scored his first goal in a 3–0 victory at the Estadio Bautista Gargantini. Goals against Gimnasia y Esgrima, Defensa y Justicia and Crucero del Norte came in two further seasons as he featured fifty-seven times for them. On 12 July 2013, Alvacete joined Primera División side Tigre.

Fellow top-flight club Godoy Cruz signed Alvacete on 30 June 2014. He stayed for 2014, 2015 and 2016 to play in fifteen fixtures, though none of which came in 2016 as he departed the team. Moves to Instituto and Santamarina in Primera B Nacional subsequently arrived, prior to Alvacete joining Villa Dálmine on 30 June 2018. His first appearances followed in July in Copa Argentina games with UAI Urquiza and River Plate.

In February 2021, Alvacete signed with Deportivo Maipú. At the end of June 2021, he was loaned out to Central Norte for the rest of the year. In January 2022, Alvacete moved to Chacarita Juniors.

Career statistics
.

References

External links

1991 births
Living people
Sportspeople from Mendoza, Argentina
Argentine footballers
Association football defenders
Primera Nacional players
Argentine Primera División players
Independiente Rivadavia footballers
Club Atlético Tigre footballers
Godoy Cruz Antonio Tomba footballers
Instituto footballers
Club y Biblioteca Ramón Santamarina footballers
Villa Dálmine footballers
Deportivo Maipú players
Central Norte players
Chacarita Juniors footballers